The EuroCup Basketball MVP of the Round is the player of the week award for each round of the secondary level European-wide professional club basketball league in Europe, EuroCup Basketball. The EuroCup Basketball League is the European-wide professional basketball league that is one tier level below the top-tier EuroLeague. The award began with the 2002–03 season.

2002–03

Regular Season

Week 1: Jamie Arnold (Krka) 40
Week 2: Nikolai Khryapa (Ural Great) 38
Week 3: Miroslav Radosevic (Roseto) 38
Week 4: Acie Earl (Darussafaka) 32
Week 5: Acie Earl (Darussafaka) 45
Week 6: Alberto Angulo (Lleida) 39
Week 7: Vincent Jones (Darussafaka) 35
Week 8: Maceo Baston (Joventut) 39
Week 9: Juan Espil (Joventut) 34
Week 10: Joe Spinks (Ricoh) 32

Playoff

Eighthfinals Game 1: Ognjen Aškrabić (FMP Zeleznik) 38
Eighthfinals Game 2: Michael Ruffin (Lleida) 30
Quarterfinals Game 1: Juan Espil (Joventut) 36
Quarterfinals Game 2: Ognjen Aškrabić (FMP Zeleznik) 32
Semifinals Game 1: Dejan Tomašević (Pamesa) 27
Semifinals Game 2: Nikola Radulović (Joventut) 22

2003–04

Regular Season

Week 1: Priest Lauderdale (Lukoil) 55
Week 2: Rasheed Brokenborough (Superfund) 48
Week 3: Tunji Awajobi (Hapoel) 35
Week 4: Jerry McCullough (Varese) 41
Week 5: Jamie Arnold (Joventut) 35
Week 6: Chris Mims (EiffelTowers) 41
Week 7: Rasheed Brokenborough (Superfund) 37
Week 8: Tunji Awajobi (Hapoel) 40
Week 9: Erik Nelson (EiffelTowers) 34
Week 10: Randy Duck (Brighton) 45

Playoff

Eighthfinals Game 1: Kimani Ffriend (Reflex) 35
Eighthfinals Game 2: Jaume Comas (Lleida) 32
Quarterfinals Game 1: Robertas Javtokas (Rytas) & Doron Sheffer (Hapoel) 24
Quarterfinals Game 2: Robertas Javtokas (Rytas) 35
Semifinals Game 1: Antonio Bueno (Real Madrid) 33
Semifinals Game 2: Willie Solomon (Hapoel) 45

2004–05

Regular Season

Week 1: Marko Marinović (Reflex) 43
Week 2: John Whorton (Darussafaka) 41
Week 3: Michael Watson (Slask) 41
Week 4: Kimani Ffriend (Hapoel) 43
Week 5: Ivan Koljević (Buducnost) 46
Week 6: Fred House (Rytas) 50
Week 7: Bill Edwards (RheinEnergie) 39
Week 8: Trojs Ostlers (Liege) 45
Week 9: Matt Nielsen (PAOK) 37
Week 10: Marcus Faison (Charleroi) & Brindley Wright (Ventspils) 39

Playoff

Eighthfinals Game 1: Pete Mickeal (Makedonikos) 36
Eighthfinals Game 2: Nebojša Bogavac (Hemofarm) 40
Quarterfinals Game 1: Pete Mickeal (Makedonikos) 33
Quarterfinals Game 2: Milenko Topić (Hemofarm) 32
Semifinals Game 1: Nebojša Bogavac (Hemofarm) & Igor Rakočević (Pamesa) 36
Semifinals Game 2: Pete Mickeal (Makedonikos) 40

2005–06

Regular Season

Week 1: Kšyštof Lavrinovič (UNICS) 36
Week 2: Vladan Vukosavljević (Hemofarm) 35
Week 3: Julius Jenkins (Euphony) 36
Week 4: Hüseyin Beşok (Le Mans) 38
Week 5: Corey Brewer (Aris) 43
Week 6: Ryan Stack (Aris) 46
Week 7: Mario Austin (Hapoel) 41
Week 8: Leroy Watkins (Queluz) 36
Week 9: Mire Chatman (Dynamo) 33
Week 10: Larry Lewis (Alicante) 36

Playoff

Eighthfinals Game 1: Brian Lynch (Euphony) 33
Eighthfinals Game 2: Savas Iliadis (Panionios) 43
Quarterfinals Game 1: David Hawkins (Roma) 32
Quarterfinals Game 2: Lazaros Papadopoulos (Dynamo) 34
Semifinals Game 1: Lazaros Papadopoulos (Dynamo) 34
Semifinals Game 2: Mire Chatman (Dynamo) 29

2006–07

Regular Season

Week 1: Chuck Eidson (Strasbourg) 37
Week 2: Kevin Houston (Dexia Mons-Hainaut) 39
Week 3: Milan Gurović (Crvena Zvezda) 42
Week 4: Saulius Štombergas (UNICS) 38
Week 5: Milan Gurović (Crvena Zvezda) 36
Week 6: Milan Gurović (Crvena Zvezda) 30
Week 7: Leon Rodgers (Eiffel Towers) 36
Week 8: Kristaps Valters (Snaidero Udine) 41
Week 9: Yemi Nicholson (Dexia Mons-Hainaut) 36
Week 10: Leon Rodgers (Eiffel Towers) 43

Playoff

Eightfinals Game 1: Chuck Eidson (Strasbourg) 31
Eightfinals Game 2: Chuck Eidson (Strasbourg) 32
Quarterfinals Game 1: Mario Austin (Hapoel) 29
Quarterfinals Game 2: Louis Bullock (Real Madrid) 26
Semifinals Game 1: Charles Smith (Real Madrid) 34
Semifinals Game 2: Felipe Reyes (Real Madrid) 35

2007–08

Regular Season

Week 1: Michael Wright (Turk Telekom) 49
Week 2: Mamadou N'Diaye (Panellinios) 41
Week 3: Jamie Arnold (Hapoel) 38
Week 4: Jamie Arnold (Hapoel) 42
Week 5: Goran Nikolić (Alba Berlin) 45
Week 6: Pero Antić (Lukoil Academic) 39
Week 7: Robert Hite (Galatasaray) & Ian Boylan (Swans Gmunden) 35
Week 8: Jackson Vroman (Akasvayu) 47
Week 9: Kaya Peker (Besiktas) 38
Week 10: Cordell Henry (Ovarense) 46

Playoff

Last 32 Game 1: Tariq Kirksay (UNICS) 41
Last 32 Game 2: Rashid Atkins (ASCO Slask) 38
Last 16 Game 1: Preston Shumpert (Besiktas) 35
Last 16 Game 2: Darjuš Lavrinovič (UNICS) 38
Quarterfinals: Shammond Williams (Pamesa) 28
Semifinals: Rudy Fernández (DKV Joventut) 25

2008–09

Regular Season

Week 1: Sandro Nicević (Benetton) 35
Week 2: Travis Hansen (Dynamo) 30
Week 3: Ivan Radenović (Panellinios) 39
Week 4: Stefan Marković (Hemofarm) 43
Week 5: Mire Chatman (Besiktas) 41
Week 6: Loukas Mavrokefalidis (Maroussi) 34

Top 16

Week 1: Andreas Glyniadakis (Maroussi) 29
Week 2: Len Matela (Spirou) 34
Week 3: Chuck Eidson (Rytas) 37
Week 4: Timofey Mozgov (Khimki) & Kelly McCarty (Khimki) 28
Week 5: Kelly McCarty (Khimki) & Khalid El-Amin (Azovmash) 35
Week 6: Marko Banić (Bilbao) 35

2009–10

Regular season

Top 16

Quarterfinals

2010–11

Regular season

Top 16

Quarterfinals

2011–12

Regular season

Top 16

Quarterfinals

2012–13

Regular season

Top 16

Quarterfinals

Semifinals

2013–14

Regular season

Last 32

Eighthfinals

Quarterfinals

Semifinals

Finals

2014–15

Regular season

Last 32

Eighthfinals

Quarterfinals

Semifinals

Finals

2015–16

Regular season

Last 32

Eighthfinals

Quarterfinals

Semifinals

2016–17

Regular season

Top 16

Quarterfinals

Semifinals

2017–18

Regular season

Top 16

Quarterfinals

Semifinals

Finals

2018–19

Regular season

Top 16

Quarterfinals

Semifinals

Finals

2019–20

Regular season

Top 16

2020–21

Regular season

Top 16

Quarterfinals

Semifinals

2021–22

Regular season

MVP of the playoff rounds

See also
EuroLeague MVP of the Round

References

External links
EuroCup Basketball Official Web Page

Awards
European basketball awards
Basketball most valuable player awards